The State Library of South Australia, or SLSA, formerly known as the Public Library of South Australia, located on North Terrace, Adelaide, is the official library of the Australian state of South Australia. It is the largest public research library in the state, with a collection focus on South Australian information, being the repository of all printed and audiovisual material published in the state, as required by legal deposit legislation. It holds the "South Australiana" collection, which documents South Australia from pre-European settlement to the present day, as well as general reference material in a wide range of formats, including digital, film, sound and video recordings, photographs, and microfiche. Home access to many journals, newspapers and other resources online is available.

History and governance

19th century

On 29 August 1834, a couple of weeks after the passing of the South Australia Act 1834, a group led by the Colonial Secretary, Robert Gouger, and solicitor Richard Hanson and a number of prominent colonists, including Ernest Giles, Edward Gibbon Wakefield, John Morphett, Robert Torrens Snr, and John Hindmarsh formed the South Australian Literary Association in Adelphi Chambers, London. Within a month, the more title was changed to the more inclusive South Australian Literary and Scientific Association. Its aim was "the cultivation and diffusion of useful knowledge throughout the colony". Although the Association lapsed and meetings ceased, a collection of books donated by members was intended as the basis of the new colony's library, and the colonists brought the collection to the Colony of South Australia aboard the Tam O'Shanter, which arrived on 18 December 1836.

The first Adelaide Mechanics' Institute (based on the concept of mechanics' institutes developed in Scotland and England in the 1820s, to provide adult education to working men) met on 23 June 1838, reported by the Southern Australian newspaper. Running into difficulties, the organisation was merged with a revived Literary and Scientific Association, with the new name of the Adelaide Literary and Scientific Association and Mechanics' Institute, electing a committee in July 1839. Over this time, the membership of the association varied between upper-middle-class and lower-middle-class. The library reopened, but the Institute did not have a permanent location, and the focus was on a programme of lectures. However the lectures dwindled and attendances varied, as the Institute tried to function as an adult education institution as well as a learned scientific society, and its last meeting was held in June 1844.

In September 1844, a group of men founded the South Australian Subscription Library, with a collection created by donation and subscriptions, and in 1845 it took over the collection of the Literary and Scientific Association and Mechanics' Institute. A permanent librarian was employed at this time, and the library served its middle-class members.

In 1847, a new Adelaide Mechanics' Institute was founded, by a group of lower-middle class men, led by schoolteacher W.A. Cawthorne. Various talks, discussions and displays were put on. This organisation merged with the South Australian Library in 1848, creating the Mechanics' Institute and South Australian Library, based in Peacock's Buildings, Hindley Street, and with membership moving back to the upper-middle class. Nathaniel Summers was appointed as the first librarian. It subsequently moved to Exchange Chambers, King William Street, but by 1855 had gone into decline.

Meanwhile, other institutes and societies were established throughout the Adelaide suburbs, including the Adelaide Philosophical Society (which later evolved into the Royal Society of South Australia). Some of these institutes asked the government for financial assistance, and Unitarian publisher John Howard Clark suggested the conversion of the Institute into a public institution. A Bill was proposed in Parliament in 1854. Between 1847 and 1856 another 13 mechanics' institutes started in other parts of the colony.

In June 1856 the South Australian Legislative Council passed Act No. 16 of 1855–6, the South Australian Institute Act, which incorporated the South Australian Institute under the control of a Board of Governors, to whose ownership all materials belonging to the old Library and Mechanics' Institute was immediately transferred. This Act also ensured the library would be open to the public free of charge, and granted funding was allocated to it. This made the library very popular particularly amongst artisans and workmen who filled it to capacity in the evenings. At this point it was a lending library, and held a large amount of fictional work. The Act also provided for a museum as part of the new organisation. The suburban institutes became subsidiaries of the SA Institute, as did the Adelaide Philosophical Society and the South Australian Society of Arts.

As new books arrived from Britain, the library expanded and soon needed new accommodation, which was found in North Terrace in 1860. The Adelaide Institute building opened in January 1861, and included rooms for the Adelaide Philosophical Society, the Medical Society and the Choral Society.

The Copyright Act 1878, Part II section 15, required that a copy of every book published in South Australia was to be deposited in the Institute by a process known as legal deposit, for preservation of the books. (After Federation, the Copyright Act (1905) replaced the earlier state copyright legislation with regard to legal deposit, but the State Library continues to collect and preserve locally produced material.)

The Public Library, Museum and Art Gallery Act 1884 renamed the South Australian Institute as Public Library, Museum and Art Gallery, and also broadened the scope of the Board's control to include the expanding network of regional and suburban institutes. It also created a new, independent body, the Adelaide Circulating Library, to take over the business of circulating books on a subscription basis. It also became the location for university lectures.

20th century
The next important piece of legislation affecting SLSA was the  1939 number 44 Libraries and Institutes Act, which repealed the Public library, Museum and Art Gallery and Institutes Act and separated the Public Library from the (newly named) Art Gallery of South Australia and South Australian Museum, established its own board and changed its name to the Public Library of South Australia. The new entity thus became a statutory corporation.

Various reorganisations occurred through the years following, but the legislation still governing the Library is number 70 Libraries Act (1982), which repealed the Libraries and Institutes Act (1939–1979) and the Libraries (Subsidies) Act 1955–1977 (with the latest version  being 12 May 2011).

During the 1990s, the Library became a Division under a series of departments, responsible to the Minister for the Arts. The State Records Act 1997 separated the responsibility for management and disposal of state government records, bringing this under a State Records Council rather than the Libraries Board.

21st century
From 2001 the Library became part of the Division of Arts SA, which was part of the Department of the Premier and Cabinet, continuing to report to the Minister for the Arts.

After the election of the Marshall government in March 2018, the post of Minister for the Arts ceased to exist, Arts South Australia (as Arts SA was now known) was dismantled and its functions transferred to direct oversight by the Department of Premier and Cabinet, Arts and Culture section.

Mortlock Wing 

The building now known as the Mortlock Wing was opened on 18 December 1884 as a "Public Library, Museum and Art Gallery for the colony of South Australia" with 23,000 books and a staff of three. It had taken over 18 years to complete after the initial foundations were laid in 1866. (In 1873 the foundations of the western wing of a proposed new block were laid, but there the matter ended until 1876, when fresh plans were drawn, and another set of foundations put in. Again the work went no further until 1879 when the west wing was finally commenced. The earlier work was condemned, and had to be removed before the Public Library could be started.) The foundation stone was laid on 7 November 1879 by Sir William Jervois and the building was constructed by Brown and Thompson at a total cost of £36,395, and opened in 1884. Supervision for the board of directors was undertaken by secretary Robert Kay (1825–1904), later general director and secretary of the Public Library, Museum, and Art Gallery of South Australia.

The building is French Renaissance in style with a mansard roof. The walls are constructed of brick with Sydney freestone facings with decorations in the darker shade of Manoora stone.

The interior has two galleries, the first supported by masonry columns, and the second by cast iron brackets. The balconies feature wrought iron balustrading ornamented with gold while the glass-domed roof allows the chamber to be lit with natural light. Two of the original gas "sunburner" lamps survive in the office space located on the second floor at the southern end.

Restoration of the building occurred in 1985 as a Jubilee 150 project by Danvers Architects, consultant architect to the South Australian Department of Housing and Construction. The $1.5 million project was jointly funded by the government and the community.

In honour of a substantial bequest from John Andrew Tennant Mortlock, the Libraries Board of South Australia resolved that a percentage of the South Australiana Collections would be housed in the wing and named the Mortlock Library of South Australiana in 1986.

After the State Library underwent a substantial redevelopment, commencing in 2001 and reaching completion in 2004, the main chamber of the Mortlock Wing became an exhibition space providing a glimpse into the history and culture of South Australia.

In August 2014 the Mortlock Wing featured in a list of the top 20 most beautiful libraries of the world, compiled by the U.S. magazine Travel + Leisure.

Collections

General reference collections 
The general reference and research material in the State Library was named the Bray Reference Library in 1987 after former SA Chief Justice, Dr John Jefferson Bray, who served on the Libraries Board of South Australia from 1944 to 1987.

Heritage collections 
The State Library has a national responsibility to collect, preserve and give access to historical and contemporary South Australian information. The South Australiana collections document South Australia from pre-white settlement to the present day, and the Northern Territory to 1911.  The South Australiana collection is one of the most comprehensive in the world due to legal deposit requirements for published material, and through donations of unpublished material.  A well known donation is the Bradman Collection of cricketing memorabilia.

York Gate Geographical and Colonial Library

The York Gate Library was acquired from the estate of Stephen William Silver, of S. W. Silver and Co. (William) a London-based company who not only sold clothing, furniture and equipment suitable for emigrants to the British Colonies, but also a series books providing relevant information for such emigrants. William had started to collect objects and books related to the areas to which their customers were migrating. These were kept in his residence at 3 York Gate, London and hence became known as the York Gate Library. When he died on 7 March 1905, the South Australia branch of the Royal Geographical Society of Australasia raised the money to buy the collection of nearly 5,000 volumes and pamphlets so they could be brought to Australia. In 2006, the centenary of the establishment of the library in Australia, the collection was threatened with eviction.

Mountford-Sheard Collection
The Mountford-Sheard Collection is a collection of journals, sound recordings and other works created, written and gathered by Charles P. Mountford, which has been inscribed on UNESCO's Memory of the World. It is of great cultural significance to Aboriginal Australians, particularly those in central Australia, the Flinders Ranges (Adnyamathanha people), Arnhem Land (Yolngu people) and the Tiwi Islands (Tiwi people), and the material is respectful of the people whose lives it documents.

Rare books 

The State Library's rare books collection is the major collection of its kind in South Australia. It comprises Australian and international items which have been identified as having a special interest through subject matter or rarity.

Children's Literature Research Collection 
The Children's Literature Research Collection was formed in 1959 and has over 65,000 books, periodicals, comics, board and table games, and toys. The collection has been enhanced by donations from South Australian individuals and families and from organisations. It is one of the State Library's heritage collections and is of international importance.

Collaborations
The Library manages, in collaboration with the History Trust of South Australia, the Centre of Democracy on the corner of North Terrace and Kintore Avenue. The Centre's gallery exhibits treasures from History Trust and State Library collections, as well as items on loan from State Records of South Australia, the Art Gallery of South Australia, the Courts Authority, Parliament House, Government House and private lenders.

National edeposit system (NED)

As a member library of National and State Libraries Australia, the organisation collaborated on the creation of the National edeposit (NED) system, which enables publishers from all over Australia to upload electronic publications as per the 2016 amendment to the Copyright Act 1968 and other regional legislation relating to legal deposit, and makes these publications publicly accessible online (depending on access conditions) from anywhere via Trove.

See also
South Australian Museum
Art Gallery of South Australia

References

Further reading

Talbot, Michael R. (2008)The Library of the South Australian Literary and Scientific Association: a combined short-title list arranged by contributor

External links

State Library of South Australia

Buildings and structures in Adelaide
Library
South Australia, State Library of
Tourist attractions in Adelaide
Libraries in South Australia
Library buildings completed in 1884
South Australian Heritage Register